The 614th Tactical Fighter Squadron is an inactive United States Air Force unit.  It was last assigned to the 401st Operations Group at Torrejon Air Base, Spain, where it was inactivated on 1 January 1992.

The squadron was first activated during World War II as the 614th Bombardment Squadron.  After training in the United States it moved to England, where it participated in the strategic bombing campaign against Germany.  It earned two Distinguished Unit Citations for combat action.  Following V-E Day, the squadron was inactivated in England.  It was briefly active in the reserves from 1947 to 1949, but does not appear to have been fully manned or equipped.

The squadron was redesignated the 614th Fighter-Bomber Squadron and activated in 1954 at Alexandria Air Force Base, Louisiana.  After temporary deployments to Southeast Asia, the squadron moved to Phan Rang Air Base, South Vietnam.  It engaged in combat operations until being withdrawn from the theater and moving to  Torrejon Air Base, Spain, where it continued fighter operations until inactivating in 1992, as the Air Force withdrew permanently stationed units from Spain.  Shortly before inactivating, its planes and pilots were used to man a provisional organization during Operation Desert Storm.

History

World War II

Organization and training for combat
The 614th Bombardment Squadron was activated March 1943 at Ephrata Army Air Base, Washington, as one of the original squadrons of the 401st Bombardment Group.  The initial cadre for the squadron was drawn from the 395th Bombardment Group at Ephrata and the 383d Bombardment Group at Rapid City Army Air Field, South Dakota.  The cadre soon departed for Orlando Army Air Base, Florida, where they conducted simulated combat missions with the Army Air Forces School of Applied Tactics out of Brooksville Army Air Field.

The ground echelon moved to Geiger Field, Washington, in May 1943 and to Great Falls Army Air Base, Montana, in July.  At Great Falls the first combat crews were assigned to the squadron.  In the final stage of training the squadrons dispersed with the 614th training at Glasgow Army Air Field.

After completing training the ground echelon left for overseas on 19 October 1943. The air echelon staged for deployment at Scott Field, Illinois, then flew to England under the control of Air Transport Command via Newfoundland, Iceland and Scotland.

Combat in the European Theater

On arrival in England, half of the 401st Group's aircrews were immediately reassigned to the 351st Bombardment Group.  The rest of the squadron became part of the Eighth Air Force at RAF Deenethorpe. The 614th became part of the 92d Combat Bombardment Wing of the 1st Bombardment Division. Its tail code was Triangle-S.

On 26 November the 614th flew its first combat mission against Bremen, Germany.  The 401st Group did not suffer the combat loss of an airplane until its ninth mission on 30 December.   The squadron operated chiefly against strategic targets, bombing industries, submarine facilities, shipyards, missile sites, marshalling yards, and airfields.  On 11 January 1944 the squadron was in the lead group of the 1st Bombardment Division in an attack against aircraft manufacturing facilities at Oschersleben, Germany.  Although the bombers were able to attack, poor weather conditions prevented the division from receiving effective fighter cover.  For over three hours the bomber formation suffered more than 400 attacks by Luftwaffe fighters, including air-to-air rocket attacks.  Despite these attacks the unit continued its attack and struck a telling blow against German aircraft production for which the squadron was awarded a Distinguished Unit Citation (DUC).

A little over a month later, on 20 February, the squadron earned its second DUC for an attack on the Erla Maschinenwerke aircraft manufacturing facilities in Leipzig, Germany.  Despite fighter attacks and battle damage to the 614th's planes, 100% of the unit's bombs fell within 1,000 feet of the aiming point.  Beginning in October 1944, the unit concentrated its attacks on Axis oil reserves.

In addition to strategic missions, squadron operations included attacks on transportation, airfields, and fortifications to support Operation Overlord, the Normandy invasion.  On D-Day the 614th attacked Normandy beachhead areas dropping bombs five minutes before troops landed.   The following month it provided close air support for Operation Cobra, the breakthrough at Saint-Lô, it also supported the siege of Brest in August and Operation Market Garden in September.  During the Battle of the Bulge in December 1944 and January 1945, the unit attacked transportation and communications in the battle area.  It supported airborne forces involved in Operation Varsity, the airborne assault across the Rhine in March 1945.

The squadron flew its last combat mission on 20 April 1945 against Brandenberg. It had flown 254 combat missions from Deenethorpe airfield.   After V-E Day, the squadron flew missions to Linz, Austria, to evacuate British and French prisoners of war.  It also flew Trolley sightseeing missions at low level, flying ground support personnel over the Ruhr and Frankfurt am Main to see the damage that had been done as a result of their efforts.

The unit was alerted for redeployment to the Pacific Theater and the last plane departed Deenethorpe in early June.  The ground echelon sailed on the RMS Queen Elizabeth on the fifth. Upon arrival in the US, personnel were granted thirty days leave, reassembling at Sioux Falls Army Air Field, South Dakota, but plans had changed and personnel were either transferred to Boeing B-29 Superfortress units or processed for discharge and the squadron was inactivated.

Reserve operations
The squadron was activated at Brooks Field (later Brooks Air Force Base), Texas in January 1947 as a unit of the reserves.  It trained under the supervision of the 178th AAF Base Unit (later 2593d Air Force Reserve Training Center) of Air Defense Command (ADC).  It is not clear whether or not the squadron was fully staffed or equipped.  In 1948, Continental Air Command assumed responsibility for managing reserve and Air National Guard units from ADC.  President Truman's reduced 1949 defense budget required reductions in the number of units in the Air Force, and the 613th was inactivated in June.

Fighter operations

Tactical Air Command

The squadron was redesignated the 614th Fighter-Bomber Squadron and activated at Alexandria Air Force Base, Louisiana in February 1954.  Initially equipped with North American F-86 Sabres, then with Republic F-84F Thunderstreaks, by 1957 the squadron was flying North American F-100 Super Sabres as the 614th Tactical Fighter Squadron.  The squadron participated in firepower demonstrations military exercises and maneuvers.  It also deployed aircraft and personnel to Europe and the Middle East to support NATO.  During the Cuban Missile Crisis, the squadron operated from Homestead Air Force Base, Florida.  By 1965, however, deployments had begun to the Pacific and Southeast Asia.

Combat in Vietnam
In the spring of 1966, the squadron's parent wing moved to Torrejon Air Base, Spain, but the squadron remained at England Air Force Base until September, when it moved to Phan Rang Air Base, in the Republic of Vietnam, where it was assigned to the 366th Tactical Fighter Wing.  Shortly after the squadron's arrival at Phan Rang, the 366th Wing moved on paper to Da Nang Air Base, and the 35th Tactical Fighter Wing became the squadron's new headquarters. The squadron continued combat operations in Vietnam until the 35th Wing stood down from combat on 26 June 1971.

Operations in Europe and the Middle East

The squadron moved on paper to rejoin the 401st Wing at Torrejon in July 1971, replacing the 353d Tactical Fighter Squadron and assuming its personnel and  McDonnell F-4 Phantom IIs.  The squadron deployed to advanced locations in Europe and the Middle East, where it stood alert status.  it deployed its forces to Doha International Airport, Qatar in 1990, where they formed the 614th Tactical Fighter Squadron (Provisional). It flew 1,303 sorties into Iraq and Kuwait, delivering 3.7 million pounds of ordnance. It was the first USAF unit to ever deploy to Qatar. It was inactivated in 1992 as the United States removed its combat units permanently stationed in Spain.

Lineage
 Constituted as the 614th Bombardment Squadron (Heavy) on 20 March 1943
 Activated on 1 April 1943
 Redesignated 614th Bombardment Squadron, Heavy c. 1 November 1943
 Inactivated on 28 August 1945
 Redesignated 614th Bombardment Squadron, Very Heavy on 27 December 1946
 Activated in the reserve on 10 January 1947
 Inactivated on 27 June 1949
 Redesignated 614th Fighter-Bomber Squadron on 24 November 1953
 Activated on 8 February 1954
 Redesignated 614th Tactical Fighter Squadron on 1 July 1958
 Inactivated on 1 January 1992

Assignments
 401st Bombardment Group, 1 April 1943 – 28 August 1945
 Tenth Air Force, 10 January 1947
 401st Bombardment Group, 30 September 1947 – 27 June 1949
 401st Fighter-Bomber Group, 8 February 1954
 401st Fighter-Bomber Wing (later 401st Tactical Fighter Wing), 25 September 1957
 834th Air Division, 27 April 1966
 366th Tactical Fighter Wing, 18 September 1966
 35th Tactical Fighter Wing, 10 October 1966
 401st Tactical Fighter Wing, 15 July 1971 – 1 January 1992

Stations
 Ephrata Army Air Base, Washington, 1 April 1943
 Geiger Field, Washington, 4 June 1943
 Great Falls Army Air Base, Montana, 8 July 1943 – 19 October 1943 (deployed to Glasgow AAF after August)
 RAF Deenethorpe (AAF-128), England, 4 November 1943 – 20 June 1945
 Sioux Falls Army Air Field, South Dakota, c. 1–28 August 1945
 Brooks Field (later Brooks Air Force Base), Texas, 10 January 1947 – 27 June 1949
 Alexandria Air Force Base (later England Air Force Base), Louisiana, 8 February 1954
 Phan Rang Air Base, Republic of Vietnam, 18 September 1966
 Torrejon Air Base, Spain, 15 July 1971 – 1 January 1992

Aircraft
 Boeing B-17 Flying Fortress, 1943–1945
 North American F-86 Sabre, 1954–1955
 Republic F-84F Thunderstreak, 1954–1957
 North American F-100 Super Sabre, 1957–1971
 McDonnell F-4 Phantom II, 1971–1983
 General Dynamics F-16 Fighting Falcon, 1983–1991

Awards and Campaigns

See also

 List of United States Air Force fighter squadrons
 General Dynamics F-16 Fighting Falcon operators
 List of F-4 Phantom II operators
 List of F-100 units of the United States Air Force 
 List of F-86 Sabre units
 B-17 Flying Fortress units of the United States Army Air Forces

References

Notes
 Explanatory notes

 Citations

Bibliography

 
 
 
 
 
 
 
  
 

Fighter squadrons of the United States Air Force
Military units and formations of the United States in the Cold War